The Shadows of Knight were an American rock band from Chicago, Illinois, that played a version of British blues influenced by their native city. When they began recording in 1965, the band's self-description was "the Stones, Animals and the Yardbirds took the Chicago blues and gave it an English interpretation. We've taken the English version of the Blues and re-added a Chicago touch," to which rock critic Richie Unterberger commented: "The Shadows of Knight's self-description was fairly accurate."

History

1960s
The band was formed in 1964 as simply the Shadows. In the spring of 1965, the band learned of an already existing British group, the Shadows. Whiz Winters, a friend who worked for their manager, Paul Sampson, in his record shop, came up with the name "The Shadows of Knight" to tie into the British Invasion in music of that time, and because all four of the band members attended Prospect High School in Mt. Prospect, Illinois, whose sports team had the name the "Knights".

Founding members included Jim Sohns (vocals; 1946–2022), Warren Rogers (lead guitar), Roger Spielmann (rhythm and lead guitar/vocals) Norm Gotsch (rhythm guitar), Wayne Pursell (bass guitar), and Tom Schiffour (drums). They released three albums in their first five years of existence. During 1965, Joe Kelley was recruited to play bass, replacing Pursell. Kelley swapped bass and lead duties with Rogers in late 1965 – at the time of the "Gloria" recordings. Guitarist and vocalist Jerry McGeorge replaced Norm Gotsch in late 1965 after Gotsch was drafted into the U.S. military. David "Hawk" Wolinski, who later worked with Rufus and Chaka Khan, replaced Rogers on bass in late 1966.

After performing in and around Chicago's northwest suburbs in 1964 and 1965, The Shadows of Knight became the house band at The Cellar in Arlington Heights, Illinois, owned by Sampson. They attracted more than 500 teenagers every Saturday and Sunday at the "Cellar" for more than six months until Sampson began booking other bands, giving them a break. A recording of a Shadows of Knight performance at The Cellar was released in 1992 by Sundazed Records as Raw 'n' Alive at the Cellar, Chicago 1966!.

A performance in support of the Byrds at Chicago's McCormick Place in early summer 1965 attracted the attention of Dunwich Records record producers Bill Traut and George Badonski. During that show, they performed "Gloria" by Van Morrison's band Them. The band signed with Dunwich shortly thereafter and recorded "Gloria" as a first effort.

Released in December 1965, "Gloria" received regional airplay. The band had slightly altered the song's lyrics, replacing Morrison's original "she comes to my room, then she made me feel alright" with "she called out my name, that made me feel alright" after influential Chicago station WLS had banned Them's original version. This simple change overcame the prevalent AM radio censorship of the era and got The Shadows of Knight's cover version of the song onto the playlist of WLS, which had censored the original. The single reached the No. 1 position on the radio station's countdown, as well as on local rival WCFL. On the Billboard national charts, "Gloria" rose to No. 10. The secondary publication Cashbox ranked "Gloria" as high as No. 7. In Canada the song reached No. 8 on the RPM Magazine charts. "Gloria" sold over one million copies, and was awarded a gold disc by the R.I.A.A.

The Shadows of Knight soon released the Gloria album, followed by the Back Door Men LP, in the summer of 1966. Subsequent singles included their version of the Bo Diddley song "Oh Yeah" (which reached No. 39 nationally), "Bad Little Woman" (No. 91), and the powerhouse "I'm Gonna Make You Mine" (No. 90). However, none of these releases approached their initial commercial success. Failure to find a winning follow-up to "Gloria" handicapped the band's earning power and led to its disintegration. Tom Schiffour left the band in spring 1967, first to be replaced by a young local fan of the band, Bruce Bruscato. He was subsequently replaced by Tom Morris. The original band fragmented further when McGeorge departed for acid-rock band H.P. Lovecraft, while Kelley left to front his own blues band. Hawk Wolinski also left the band to form Bangor Flying Circus with Schiffour and guitarist Alan De Carlo.

By mid-1967, the only original member of the Shadows of Knight remaining was vocalist Jim Sohns, who, through simple default, inherited the band's name and legacy. Contrary to claims, Sohns owned the band's name. In 1968, Dunwich sold the master tapes to its Shadow of Knight recordings to Atlantic Records for one dollar. Sohns then moved the band from Chicago to New York, where it signed with Buddah Records. Sohns had hoped to take the band in a British power-rock direction, but the Super K record label pulled them into a more commercial orientation, pairing the band with bubblegum groups such as the 1910 Fruitgum Company and the Ohio Express on tour. In 1969, the second generation Shadows of Knight released "Shake" on Buddha's short-lived subsidiary Team Records; the track eventually climbed to No. 46 (No. 37 Canada, December 1968). That same year, without the band's knowledge or consent, the unsuccessful update "Gloria '69" was released by Dunwich.

"Shake" and its B-side, "From Way Out to Way Under" were actually recorded by Sohns and a number of studio musicians, on the understanding that a Shadows of Knight reassembled by Sohns would record the follow-up album. That album, Shadows of Knight is today regarded as a distinct recording oddity, being an attempt to mix punk and bubblegum music. From 1960s to 1970s, Chicago jazz rock, blue-eyed soul, blues rock, garage rock scene that included the Shadows of Knight, Chicago, The Buckinghams, the Mauds and The Ides of March.

1970s–1980s
The four years after the breakup of the original Shadows was a dark creative period with little financial success. The band's repertoire consisted mostly of pop cover songs, which allowed them to survive by playing clubs. The second iteration of the band consisted of John Fisher, former lead guitar of the Glass Menagerie, on bass, Woody Woodruff and Dan Baughman on guitars, and Ken Turkin on drums. Turkin was replaced in early 1969 by Paul Scarpelli, and in 1970 Jack "Hawkeye" Daniels replaced Woodruff on guitar. The band's lineup remained the same for two years, and it recorded "I Am the Hunter." John Fisher was replaced by Jorge Gonzales on bass in 1971, who was subsequently replaced by John Hardy the next year. He was then replaced by studio bassist Don Ferrone.

In 1972, Nuggets was created by Lenny Kaye, and the album include the Shadows of Knight 1966 song "Oh Yeah". Over subsequent decades, Sohns fronted varying incarnations of the group on the oldies circuit.  He also spent a period of time reflecting on his future in the music business, choosing to become the road manager of the band Skafish from 1978 to 1980. He would join the band to sing "Gloria" as the band's encore.

1990s
Commencing as of the 1990s, the Shadows of Knight enjoyed a resurgence in public interest, in significant part due to the 1998 release of their first two albums, in remastered form, by Sundazed Records. In 1992, Performance Records (aka "Donewitch" Records) released The Shadows Of Knight – Live, Featuring "Gloria". This was a previously unreleased performance recorded live in Rockford, Illinois, in 1972.   .    The album is also noted as containing "a wonderfully blistering guitar-laced extended version of Willie Dixon's 'I Just Want to Make Love to You'", which is nearly twelve minutes long.  Also in 1992, another live recording, Raw 'n' Alive at The Cellar, 1966, was released by Sundazed Records.  As noted by Richie Unterberger, "This is one of the very few live garage band tapes from the mid-'60s of relatively decent sound quality (considering the standards of the era). The song selection of this set should also please fans of one of the most famed '60s garage bands, captured here at a club in their home turf of Chicago in December 1966."  In 1994, Rhino Records released Dark Sides:  The Best of The Shadows of Knight. Unterberger had mixed feelings about this collection, particularly in view of the absence of "I Just Want to Make Love to You".

2000s
In 2006, the Shadows of Knight headlined Little Steven's cross-country "Underground Garage" tour with The Romantics. The Shadows also joined Cheap Trick's Halloween show ("Cheap Trick or Treat"), along with guest appearances by members of the Romantics and the Charms. This performance was subsequently televised on VH-1 Classic. At shows on the 2006 tour, they were joined onstage at various times by Rick Mullen (of Van Morrison, Commander Cody, Don McLean), Vince Martell  (Vanilla Fudge), Mark Stein (Vanilla Fudge), and members of The Romantics.  Also in 2006, a CD of new material, A Knight to Remember, was released co-produced by Bobby Messano and Lee Brovitz. Messano played all of the guitars and assisted with background vocals on the album.

In 2008, the band toured as part of "The Psychedelic Shack Tour", which also featured a re-formed Nazz, Vince Martell and, on occasion, Henry Gross. Also in 2008, a new CD was released, Rock 'n' Roll Survivors, containing a further reworking of "Gloria".

2010s–2022

Joe Kelley died on September 1, 2013, after a brief battle with lung cancer. He was 67.

On May 27, 2020, classic-era members Jimy Sohns and Jerry McGeorge teamed up with producer/musician Michael Weber to release their first new single together in 53 years, "Wild Man." 

In March 2022, Jimy Sohns released his only solo single in collaboration with Jon Povey, ex Pretty Things, and the Technicolour Dream, an Italian neo-psychedelic band active from the late 70s, who released 3 albums with Twink in 2013-2019. The single includes 2 garage / psychedelic songs, "Born Again" and "Isis Calling", both written by Marco Conti and Fabio Porretti of the Technicolour Dream and Jon Povey.

Lead singer and founding member James "Jimy" Sohns (born on August 23, 1946 in Chicago) died of complications from a stroke on July 29, 2022, at age 75.

Band members

 Jim Sohns – vocals (1964–2022; died 2022)
 Jerry McGeorge – rhythm guitar, backing vocals (1965–1967, 2016, 2020–2022)
 Bobby Messano-Lead & Rhythm Guitars, backing vocals, producer  (2005-2009)
 Michael Weber – lead guitar, backing vocals, drums, keyboard (2013–2022)
 Hawk Wolinski – bass, keyboards (1966–1967, 2015, 2016)
 Jeff Millar Sax-percussion, keys, guitar, backing vocals, producer (2012)
 Tom Schiffour – drums (1964–1967, 2016)
 Joe Kelley – lead guitar (1965–1967; died 2013)
 Warren Rogers – bass, rhythm guitar, vocals (1964–1966)
 Norm Gotsch – rhythm guitar (1964–1965)
 Wayne Pursell – bass (1964–1965)

Discography

Singles

Studio albums

Live albums

See also
 Blue-eyed soul
 Protopunk

References

External links
 Shadows of Knight Japanese Tribute Site: "The Original Punks from The Windy City".

Garage rock groups from Illinois
Musical groups from Chicago
Protopunk groups
Atlantic Records artists
Atco Records artists
Radar Records artists
Musical groups established in 1964
Musical groups disestablished in 2022
1964 establishments in Illinois
2022 disestablishments in Illinois